Daniela Giménez (born 20 August 1992) is an Argentine Paralympic swimmer who competes in international level events, she mostly participates in breaststroke events. She competed at the  2008 Summer Paralympics , 2012 Summer Paralympics, 2016 Summer Paralympics, and 2020 Summer Paralympics.

Life 
She was born without her left hand. 

She studied at  Pontifical Catholic University of Argentina .

She competed at the 2007 Parapan American Games, winning a bronze medal,  2011 Parapan American Games, where she won two gold medals, 2015 Parapan American Games, 2018 World Para Swimming World Series, and  2019 Parapan American Games.

References

1992 births
Living people
Swimmers from Buenos Aires
Paralympic swimmers of Argentina
Swimmers at the 2008 Summer Paralympics
Swimmers at the 2012 Summer Paralympics
Swimmers at the 2016 Summer Paralympics
Medalists at the World Para Swimming Championships
Medalists at the 2011 Parapan American Games
Medalists at the 2015 Parapan American Games
Medalists at the 2019 Parapan American Games
Argentine female breaststroke swimmers
Swimmers at the 2020 Summer Paralympics
Argentine female medley swimmers
S9-classified Paralympic swimmers
21st-century Argentine women